Josef Šedivec is a retired Czechoslovak-American wildwater and slalom canoeist  who competed from the mid-1960s to the early 1970s. He two silver medals at the 1965 ICF Canoe Slalom World Championships in Spittal, earning them in the mixed C-2 event and the mixed C-2 team event. She also won a silver medal in the individual C-2 Downriver event and a gold medal in the C-2 team mixed Downriver event at the 1965 Wildwater Canoeing World Championships also in Spittal.

References

Czech male canoeists
Czechoslovak male canoeists
American male canoeists
Living people
Year of birth missing (living people)
Medalists at the ICF Canoe Slalom World Championships